Subarnachar is an upazila (sub-district) of the Noakhali District, located in Bangladesh's Chittagong Division. The Bhulua River and Sandwip Channel flows through it. A number of Subarnachar residents have migrated to Oman where they form a small diaspora community.

History
The islands in the upazila formed in 1959 and many poor migrants started settling there. This was followed by a land dispute in 1986 with foreign land grabbing forces. The clashes killed hundreds of people and destroyed thousands of homes. The settlers of Subarnachar sacrificed many precious lives to survive on that day. The history of this upazila has been written through the relentless struggle of the working people who have made this salty char habitable through their creative activities. Subarnachar has suffered from flooding in many occasions such as on 12 November 1970 as well as in 1985, 1991 and 1998. Subarnachar was given upazila status on 2 April 2005, taking 7 unions from Noakhali Sadar Upazila.

Demographics
As of the 2011 Bangladesh census, Subarnachar Upazila has a population of 290000. Males constitute 49.82% of the population, and females 50.18%. Subarnachar has an average literacy rate of 32.7%.

Administration
Subarnachar Upazila is divided into eight union parishads: Charamanullah, Charbata, Charjabbar, Charjubilee, Charklark, Charwapda, East Charbata, and Mohammadpur. The union parishads are subdivided into 52 mauzas and 53 villages.

Upazila Chairmen

Education
The average literacy rate of Subarnachar is 32.83%; with males at 37.50% and females at 28.15%. There are many notable institutions in Subarnachar. There are 241 mosques and 12 madrasas including the Char Jubilee Rabbania Fazil Madrasa and the Char Bata Islamia Alim Madrasa.

See also
 Upazilas of Bangladesh
 Districts of Bangladesh
 Divisions of Bangladesh

References

Upazilas of Noakhali District